Isaac Boakye  (born 21 September 1984) is a Ghanaian football player who played as a defender in India for Chirag United Club Kerala and in Tanzania for Young Africans.

Career 
Boakye featured for Young Africans S.C. in the Tanzanian Premier League in the process winning the league on three occasions.

Honours 
Young Africans

 Tanzanian Premier League: 2010–11, 2012–13, 2014–15

References 

1984 births
Living people
Ghanaian footballers
Real Sportive players
New Edubiase United F.C. players
Chirag United Club Kerala players
Association football defenders
Ghanaian expatriate footballers
Ghanaian expatriate sportspeople in India
Ghanaian expatriate sportspeople in Tanzania
Young Africans S.C. players
Tanzanian Premier League players